Miros may refer to:

 Anna Miros (born 1985), Polish volleyball player
 MirOS BSD, operating system
 MirOS Licence, content licence